Adolf "Dado" Topić (born 4 September 1950, Siverić at Drniš) is a rock musician from Croatia and the former Yugoslavia. He was the lead singer and founder of Time, a 1970s progressive rock band. From 1970 to late 1971, he was also the lead singer of the popular prog-rock band Korni Grupa (also known as The Kornelyans). He is a male vocalist who sang the entry from Croatia in the Eurovision Song Contest 2007, together with the band Dragonfly.

Topić has performed at Etnofest Neum twice: in 1997 with "Na te mislim" and in 2008 with "Nema prodaje".

He collaborated (singing and producing albums) with Smak.

Discography
1972 - Time
1975 - Time II
1976 - Život u Čizmama s visokom petom
1979 - Neosedlani
1980 - Šaputanje na jastuku
2001 - Otok u moru tišine
2004 - Apsolutno sve
2007 - Ultimate collection
2009 - Live in Kerempuh

References

External links

Biography (in Croatian)
Dado Topić born on 4 September 1949 (in Croatian)

1949 births
Living people
People from Nova Gradiška
20th-century Croatian male singers
Croatian rock singers
Yugoslav male singers
Eurovision Song Contest entrants for Croatia
Eurovision Song Contest entrants of 2007
City Records artists
21st-century Croatian male singers